Sounds from the Gathering is the second full-length studio album by the band Cobweb Strange and was released in October 1998. Unlike their first album The Temptation of Successive Hours, which only had one international single, multiple songs from Sounds from the Gathering received radio airplay internationally.

Track listing

Personnel
 Wade Summerlin – lead vocals, bass guitar, acoustic guitar
 Derik Rinehart – drums, backing vocals
 Keith Rinehart – lead guitar
 Trevon Broad – cello, keyboards

References

1998 albums
Cobweb Strange albums